Nevoid basal-cell carcinoma syndrome (NBCCS) is an inherited medical condition involving defects within multiple body systems such as the skin, nervous system, eyes, endocrine system, and bones.  People with this syndrome are particularly prone to developing a common and usually non-life-threatening form of non-melanoma skin cancer. About 10% of people with the condition do not develop basal-cell carcinomas (BCCs).

The name Gorlin syndrome refers to the American oral pathologist and human geneticist Robert J. Gorlin (1923–2006). The American dermatologist Robert W. Goltz (1923–2014) was his co-author, which is the basis for the term 'Gorlin-Goltz syndrome'.

First described in 1960 by Gorlin and Goltz, NBCCS is an autosomal dominant condition that can cause unusual facial appearances and a predisposition for basal-cell carcinoma, a type of skin cancer which rarely spreads to other parts of the body. The prevalence is reported to be 1 case per 56,000–164,000 population. Recent work in molecular genetics has shown NBCCS to be caused by mutations in the PTCH (Patched) gene found on chromosome arm 9q. Children who inherit the defective gene from either parent will also have the disorder.

Signs and symptoms
Some or all of the following may be seen in someone with Gorlin syndrome:
 Multiple basal-cell carcinomas of the skin
 Odontogenic keratocyst: Seen in 75% of patients and is the most common finding. There are usually multiple lesions found in the mandible. They occur at a young age (19 years average).
 Rib and vertebrae anomalies
 Intracranial calcification
 Skeletal abnormalities: bifid ribs, kyphoscoliosis, early calcification of falx cerebri (diagnosed with AP radiograph)
 Distinct faces: frontal and temporoparietal bossing, hypertelorism, and mandibular prognathism
 Bilateral ovarian fibromas
 10% develop cardiac fibromas

Cause
Mutations in the human homologue of Drosophila patched (PTCH1), a tumor suppressor gene on chromosome 9, were identified as the underlying genetic event in this syndrome.

Diagnosis
Diagnosis of NBCCS is made by having two major criteria or one major and two minor criteria. 

The major criteria consist of the following:
 more than 2 BCCs or 1 BCC in a person younger than 20 years;
 odontogenic keratocysts of the jaw
 3 or more palmar or plantar pits
 ectopic calcification or early (<20 years) calcification of the falx cerebri
 bifid, fused, or splayed ribs
 first-degree relative with NBCCS.

The minor criteria include the following:
 macrocephaly.
 congenital malformations, such as cleft lip or palate, frontal bossing, eye anomaly (cataract, coloboma, microphthalmia, nystagmus).
 other skeletal abnormalities, such as Sprengel deformity, pectus deformity, polydactyly, syndactyly or hypertelorism.
 radiologic abnormalities, such as bridging of the sella turcica, vertebral anomalies, modeling defects or flame-shaped lucencies of hands and feet.
 ovarian and cardio fibroma or medulloblastoma (the latter is generally found in children below the age of two).

People with NBCCS need education about the syndrome, and may need counseling and support, as coping with the multiple BCCs and multiple surgeries is often difficult. They should reduce UV light exposure, to minimize the risk of BCCs. They should also be advised that receiving Radiation therapy for their skin cancers may be contraindicated. They should look for symptoms referable to other potentially involved systems: the CNS, the genitourinary system, the cardiovascular system, and dentition.

Genetic counseling is advised for prospective parents, since one parent with NBCCS causes a 50% chance that their child will also be affected.

Treatment
Treatment is usually supportive treatment, that is, treatment to reduce any symptoms rather than to cure the condition.
 Enucleation of the odontogenic cysts can help, but new lesions, infections and jaw deformity are usually a result.
 The severity of the basal-cell carcinoma determines the prognosis for most patients. BCCs rarely cause gross disfigurement, disability or death .
 Genetic counseling

Incidence
NBCCS has an incidence of 1 in 50,000 to 150,000 with higher incidence in Australia. One aspect of NBCCS is that basal-cell carcinomas will occur on areas of the body which are not generally exposed to sunlight, such as the palms and soles of the feet and lesions may develop at the base of palmar and plantar pits.
One of the prime features of NBCCS is development of multiple BCCs at an early age, often in the teen years. Each person who has this syndrome is affected to a different degree, some having many more characteristics of the condition than others.

See also 
 List of cutaneous conditions
 List of radiographic findings associated with cutaneous conditions
 List of dental abnormalities associated with cutaneous conditions
 List of cutaneous conditions associated with increased risk of nonmelanoma skin cancer

References

External links 

 GeneReviews/NCBI/NIH/UW entry on Nevoid Basal Cell Carcinoma Syndrome
  GeneReviews/NCBI/NIH/UW entry on 9q22.3 Microdeletion
 US National Library of Medicine page

Cell surface receptor deficiencies
Epidermal nevi, neoplasms, and cysts
Syndromes with macrocephaly
Syndromes with tumors
Rare syndromes
Syndromes affecting the skin